Sydenham is a railway station in Sydenham in the London Borough of Lewisham, South London. Originally opened in 1839, the station is located on the former Croydon Canal, which is now a branch of the Brighton Main Line, often known as the Sydenham Corridor. Sydenham falls within Travelcard Zone 3 and is served by London Overground and Southern.

History

The Croydon Canal opened in 1809 linking the Grand Surrey Canal to Croydon, however the waterway was never successful, and in 1836, it was the first canal to be abandoned by an Act of Parliament. The alignment was purchased by the London and Croydon Railway, who drained the canal and re-opened as a railway on the 5 June 1839. In 1844, L&CR was given authority to test the first atmospheric railway equipment between Dartmouth Arms (now Forest Hill) and West Croydon. In 1846, the railway became part of the London, Brighton and South Coast Railway and in the following year, the system was abandoned. The station was originally built south of Sydenham Road (A212) however, due to the construction of the branch to Crystal Palace in 1852, platform 2 was resited to its current position. Platform 1 and its station building remained south of the road bridge, until 1982 when British Rail decided to construct a replacement platform 90 meters north, parallel to Peak Hill Gardens due to the retaining wall beginning to collapse.

The Big Four grouping led to Southern Railway (SR) management until nationalistation in 1948. Between 1948 and 1982 Sydenham was part of the Southern Region and following sectorisation, until privatisation, Sydenham became part of the Network SouthEast sector. Upon privatisation in May 1996, the station management passed to Connex South Central. Connex was stripped of the franchise due to poor financial management and in 2001, Govia South Central (Southern) took over the franchise and management of the station. Southern remained the sole train provider until 2010, when London Overground took over management of the station and began running trains as part of the East London Line extension.

Sydenham was the first station to serve the area, however, there are, or have been, five other stations in the Sydenham:
  on the Hayes Line
  on the now closed Crystal Palace (High Level) line

Station layout
Like all intermediate stations between New Cross Gate and Norwood Junction, Sydenham has two platforms, facing two (up and down slow) of the four tracks with the two fast tracks run between the two slow lines. There are three entrances – the ticket office on platform 2 from Sydenham Station Approach, an entrance on platform 1 from Peak Hill Gardens and a gate on platform 2. A small cafe is in the main station building.

Services

Services at Sydenham are operated by Southern and London Overground using  and  EMUs.

The typical off-peak service in trains per hour is:
 2 tph to 
 8 tph to  via 
 2 tph to  via 
 4 tph to 
 4 tph to 

Connections
London Buses routes 122, 176,  197, 202 and 450 serve the station. While routes 75 and 194 run close by.

References

External links

National Rail: Sydenham (SYD)
National Rail: Sydenham station plan
Southern: Sydenham page
Southern:  Live departures, Sydenham

Railway stations in the London Borough of Lewisham
Former London, Brighton and South Coast Railway stations
Railway stations in Great Britain opened in 1839
Railway stations served by London Overground
Railway stations served by Govia Thameslink Railway
Sydenham, London